G. Kaito Aye is a Nationalist Democratic Progressive Party politician from Nagaland. He is currently serving as Cabinet minister in Government of Nagaland and member of Nagaland Legislative Assembly representing Satakha.

Political Career
He has been elected in Nagaland Legislative Assembly election in 1998,2003 as a candidate of Indian National Congress and in 2008,2013 as a candidate of  Naga People’s Front and as candidate of Janata Dal (United) in 2018 but later joined  Nationalist Democratic Progressive Party  and as a candidate of Nationalist Democratic Progressive Party in 2023 from  Satakha Assembly constituency .  G Kaito Aye  Minister for Roads and Bridges quit  the Naga People's Front(NPF) party on 15 February 2018 and joined JDU  .  He is minister of Agriculture and Cooperative in Fourth Neiphiu Rio ministry from 2018.

References 

Living people
Nationalist Democratic Progressive Party politicians
Nagaland MLAs 2018–2023
Naga People's Front politicians
Janata Dal (United) politicians
Year of birth missing (living people)
People from Zünheboto district
Naga people